King's Stanley is a village in Gloucestershire, England, situated southwest of the town of Stroud. The village is part of what is known locally as 'The Stanleys', along with its neighbours Leonard Stanley and Stanley Downton. Marling Close, which contains the local playing fields on which the cricket and football teams play, was donated to the village by local magnates The Marlings who also helped found Marling School, and is now in the care of the Marling Trust. The village is overlooked by Selsley common.
The village is home to the oldest Baptist Church in Gloucestershire that started meeting in 1640. In the Domesday Book of 1086 it is recorded as held by Turstin FitzRolf.

The 12th century parish church of St George is a grade I listed building.

The Stanley Mills woollen mill at Ryeford was built in the early 19th century. The principal part of the mill is a Grade I listed building.

Education
King's Stanley is home to a C of E Primary School, established by amalgamating the Infant and Junior Schools on the site of the old Junior School. The Primary School was inspected by Ofsted in October 2009, and judged to be "Outstanding". In 2014 it was rated "Good".

Notable people
 William James (1754-1805), the great-grandfather of Wild West outlaw Jesse James.
 Anthony Keck, eighteenth century architect who had his workshops at King's Stanley throughout his life and is buried in St. George's in the village.
 Sir Charles Murray Marling (1862-1933), British Diplomat and Ambassador.

References

External links

Parish council website
British History Online - King's Stanley entry.
 Stroud Voices (Kings Stanley filter) - oral history site

Villages in Gloucestershire
Stroud District
Civil parishes in Gloucestershire